Ottawa Township is a township in Franklin County, Kansas, USA.  As of the 2000 census, its population was 868.

Geography
According to the USGS, it contains five cemeteries: Highland, Hope, Indian, Mount Calvary and Mount Evergreen.

The streams of Appanoose Creek, Eightmile Creek, Island Creek, Nugent Creek, Sand Creek, Spring Creek, Tauy Creek, Walnut Creek, Wilson Creek and Wolf Creek run through this township.

References
 USGS Geographic Names Information System (GNIS)

External links
 US-Counties.com
 City-Data.com

Townships in Franklin County, Kansas
Townships in Kansas